Before I Sleep may refer to:

 Before I Sleep (album), a 2013 album by Bo Bruce
 Before I Sleep (film), a 2013 drama film
 "Before I Sleep", the fifteenth episode of the first season of Stargate Atlantis